Jafarabad County is in Qom province, Iran. The capital of the county is the city of Jafariyeh. At the 2006 census, the region's population (as Jafarabad District of Qom County) was 19,594 in 4,859 households. The following census in 2011 counted 20,064 people in 5,557 households. At the 2016 census, the district's population was 21,963 in 6,429 households. It was separated from Qom County on 10 May 2021 to form Jafarabad County.

Administrative divisions

The population history of Jafarabad County's administrative divisions (as a district of Qom County) over three consecutive censuses is shown in the following table.

References

Counties of Qom Province